The following is a list of association football managers who won Ligue 1 (the top French professional league in the French football league system, since its establishment in 1932. Contested by twenty clubs, it operates on a system of promotion and relegation with second-tier Ligue 2. The league was inaugurated on 11 September 1932 under the name National before switching to Division 1 in 1933. The name lasted for almost seven decades before it was changed to its current name in 2002. The reigning champions are Paris Saint-Germain, who won their tenth title in the 2021–22 season under the management of Mauricio Pochettino.

Winning managers

Key

Multiple winners
† denotes managers currently coaching in Ligue 1, as of December 2020.

Winners by nationality

Notes

A.  During World War II, competitive football was suspended by the French government, although football clubs continued playing in regional competitions. During these so-called "war championships", professionalism was abolished by the Vichy regime and clubs were forced to participate in regional leagues, designated Zone Sud (South Zone) and Zone Nord (North Zone). The Ligue de Football Professionnel (LFP) and the French Football Federation (FFF) do not recognise these championships played between 1939 and 1945.

B.  The 1992–93 season was originally won by Marseille, under the management of Jean Fernandez (August–November 1992) and Raymond Goethals (November 1992 – June 1993). The title was originally attributed to Goethals' as his third consecutive title with the club. However, in September 1993 the French Football Federation rescinded Marseille's championship title due to a match fixing scandal in which Marseille had allegedly offered bribes to several Valenciennes players so that they would lose their home fixture against Marseille played in May 1993. Although Paris Saint-Germain managed by Artur Jorge had finished the season as runners-up, with four points behind Marseille, the title eventually remained unattributed by the FFF and no winner was ever declared for the 1992–93 season.

See also
List of English football championship winning managers
List of Spanish football championship winning managers

References

Ligue 1 managers
France league champions